A vestibule (also anteroom, antechamber, or foyer) is a small room leading into a larger space such as a lobby, entrance hall or passage, for the purpose of waiting, withholding the larger space view, reducing heat loss, providing storage space for outdoor clothing, etc.  The term applies to structures in both modern and classical architecture since ancient times. In modern architecture, a vestibule is typically a small room next to the outer door and connecting it with the interior of the building. In ancient Roman architecture, a vestibule was a partially enclosed area between the interior of the house and the street.

Ancient usage

Ancient Greece
Vestibules were common in ancient Greek temples. Due to the construction techniques available at the time, it was not possible to build large spans. Consequently, many entranceways had two rows of columns that supported the roof and created a distinct space around the entrance.

In ancient Greek houses, the prothyrum was the space just outside the door of a house, which often had an altar to Apollo or a statue, or a laurel tree.

In elaborate houses or palaces, the vestibule could be divided into three parts, the prothyron (πρόθυρον), the thyroreion (θυρωρεῖον, lit. 'porter's lodge'), and the proaulion (προαύλιον).

The vestibule in ancient Greek homes served as a barrier to the outside world, and also added security to discourage unwanted entrance into the home and unwanted glances into the home. The vestibule's alignment at right angles of private interior spaces, and the use of doors and curtains also added security and privacy from the outside. The Classical Period marked a change in the need for privacy in Greek society, which ultimately led to the design and use of vestibules in Greek homes.

Ancient Rome

In ancient Roman architecture, where the term originates, a vestibule was a space that was sometimes present between the interior fauces of a building leading to the atrium and the street. Vestibules were common in ancient architecture. A Roman house was typically divided into two different sections: the first front section, or the public part, was introduced with a vestibule. These vestibules contained two rooms, which usually served as waiting rooms or a porters’ lodge where visitors could get directions or information. Upon entering a Roman house or domus, one would have to pass through the vestibule before entering the fauces, which led to the atrium.

The structure was a mixture between a modern hall and porch.

Church architecture

From the 5th century onward, vestibules were used in churches in both the East and the West.

In Roman Catholic and some Anglican churches the vestibule has a practical purpose. It is usually a spacious area which holds church information such as literature, pamphlets, and bulletin announcements. It also houses the holy water for worshippers. In Orthodox and Byzantine church architecture, the temple antechamber is more commonly referred to as an exonarthex.

In early Christian architecture, the vestibule replaced the more extravagant atrium or quadriporticus in favor for a more simple area to house the vase of holy water.

Palace architecture 
Vestibules are common in palace architecture. The style of vestibule used in Genoa, Italy was transformed from a previously modest design to a more ornamental structure, which satisfied Genoese aristocracy, while becoming an influential transformation for Italian palaces. The Genoese vestibule became a prominent feature of their palace architecture. These vestibules would sometimes include a fountain or large statue. The Genoese vestibule was large and exaggerated, and seemed "rather designed to accommodate a race of giants."

Modern usage

In contemporary usage, a vestibule constitutes an area surrounding the exterior door. It acts as an antechamber between the exterior and the interior structure. Often it connects the doorway to a lobby or hallway. It is the space one occupies once passing the door, but not yet in the main interior of the building

Although vestibules are common in private residences, as a modified mud room, they are especially prevalent in more opulent buildings, such as government ones, designed to elicit a sense of grandeur by contrasting the vestibule's small space with the following greater one, and by adding the aspect of anticipation. The residence of the White House in the United States is such an example, but somewhat confusing.  At the north portico, it contains a  tiny vestibule now between the doors flushed with the outer and inner faces of the exterior wall of, and in the past inside, the Entrance Hall (called incorrectly Vestibule) separated from the not much bigger Cross Hall by just 2 double columns. The difference in sizes between a vestibule and the following space is better illustrated by the—so called—entrance (15) to the main gallery in the Solomon R. Guggenheim Museum by Frank Lloyd Wright. Many government buildings mimic the classical architecture from which the vestibule originates.

A purely utilitarian use of vestibules in modern buildings is to create an "air lock" entry. Such vestibules consist of merely a set of inner doors and a set of outer doors, the intent being to reduce air infiltration to the building by having only one set of doors open at any given time.

ATM vestibule
An ATM vestibule is an enclosed area with automated teller machines that is accessible from the outside of a building, but typically features no further entrance beyond the vestibule. There may be a secure entrance to the vestibule which requires a card to open.

ATM vestibules may also contain CCTV, panic alarms and other security devices to help prevent criminal activity.

Railroad use

The vestibule on a railroad passenger car is an enclosed area at the end of the car body, usually separated from the main part of the interior by a door, which is power-operated on most modern equipment. Entrance to and exit from the car is through the side doors, which lead into the vestibule. When passenger cars are coupled, their vestibules are joined by mating faceplate and diaphragm assemblies to create a weather-tight seal for the safety and comfort of passengers who are stepping from car to car.

Commercial buildings 

The U.S. Department of Energy Building Energy Codes Program released a publication on June 19, 2018, which detailed the requirements of a vestibule to be used in commercial buildings. The publication states it requires vestibules to reduce the amount of air that infiltrates a space in order to aid in energy conservation, as well as increasing the comfortability near entrance doors. By creating an air lock entry, vestibules reduce infiltration losses or gains caused by wind.

One other requirement of the design is that it is not necessary for both sets of door to be open in order to pass through the vestibule, and they should have devices that allow for self-closing.

An example of such is in New York City where in the winter, temporary sidewalk vestibules are commonly placed in front of entrances to restaurants to reduce cold drafts from reaching customers inside.

See also
Entryway
Genkan
Propylaeum
Antarala, vestibule in certain Hindu temples

References

Citations

Sources

Further reading

Rooms